Cúc Phương National Park is located in Ninh Bình Province, in Vietnam's Red River Delta. Cuc Phuong was Vietnam's first national park and is the country's largest nature reserve. The park is one of the most important sites for biodiversity in Vietnam.

History 

In 1960 Cúc Phương was made into a forest reserve and in 1962 Cúc Phương National Park was consecrated by President Ho Chi Minh. Human habitation in Cúc Phương dates back long before the park’s creation, 7,000-12,000 years ago. Artifacts from that time have been found in numerous caves within the park, including human graves, stone axes, pointed bone spears, oyster shell knives, and tools for grinding. In 1789 the Quen Voi section of the park was the site of a major battle in the civil war between Nguyễn Huệ and Thăng Long. More recently, conflicts have emerged between the government and 2,500 Muong ethnic minority tribesmen who live, farm, and hunt in the park. In 1987, 500 Muong were relocated outside of the park because of issues over poaching and land use.

Landscape and climate 

Cúc Phương is situated in the foothills of the northern Annamite Range. The park consists of verdant karst mountains and lush valleys. Elevation varies from 150 meters (500 feet) to 656 m (2,152 feet) at the summit of May Bac Mountain, or Silver Cloud Mountain. The limestone mountains house numerous caves, many of which are accessible for exploration.

The average temperature in Cúc Phương is 21 Celsius (70 Fahrenheit), with a mean winter temperature of 9C (48F). High temperatures can reach above 30C (85 F) and lows are just above zero (32 F). At the low elevations in the valley the temperature is hot and humid while at higher elevations the temperature drops and frostbite is a threat. On average it rains more than 200 days a year and the average annual rainfall is 2,100mm (7 feet). The dry season is November to February, the driest months being December and January.

Flora and fauna 

Cúc Phương is home to an amazing diversity of flora and fauna. Inhabitants of the park include 97 species of mammals, most notable endangered langurs; 300 species of birds; 36 reptilian species; 17 species of amphibians; 11 species of fish; 2,000 species of vascular plants, and thousands of species of insects. A number of species in the park are listed on Vietnam Red Book of endangered species.

Primates in the park include macaques, gibbon, François's leaf monkey and slow loris.
Other mammals include bats, porcupine, flying squirrel, small striped squirrel, belly-banded squirrel, and the rare black giant squirrel. In the past the park was home to Asiatic black bears, wild dogs, elephants, rhinos, and tigers, but over hunting and lack of prey have most led to the loss of these species. Leopards, clouded leopards, and jungle cats may still be present in the park.

Bird species include bar-backed partridge, scaly-breasted partridge, silver pheasant, red junglefowl, grey peacock-pheasant, laughingthrushes, red-vented barbet, green-eared barbet, scimitar-billed babblers, brown boobook, scarlet minivet, racket-tailed drongos, racket-tailed treepie, white-winged blue magpie. Migrant species include thrushes, flycatchers, tits, finches, pipits amongst others. Hornbills can also be spotted in the forest.

An endemic subspecies of sub-terranean cave fish is also found in the park.  It is also the type locality of many invertebrate species including: Zaxiphidiopsis bazyluki.

Flora in the park includes multi-layered canopy; trees up to 70m in height; flowers, including, orchids; ferns with amazingly tall leaves; and an abundance of liana and cauliflory. The park also contains plants used for such practicalities as spices and medicines as well as edible fruits, nuts and shoots.

Conservation programs 

There are three conservation programs located in the Cúc Phương National park:

Endangered Primate Rescue Center 

The primate center houses specimens of langurs, loris, and gibbon species, include the critically endangered Delacour's langur, golden-headed langur, and black crested gibbon. The primate center was established in 1993 with the help of the  Frankfurt Zoological Society and has grown to 180 animals in 50 cages, 4 houses, and two semi-wild enclosures.

Carnivore and Pangolin Conservation Program 
The Carnivore and Pangolin Conservation Program (CPCP) is dedicated to the conservation of small carnivores (civets, linsangs, small cats, weasels, otters and badgers) and pangolins in Vietnam. The program was established in 1995 as a species specific program for the endangered Owston's civet and has since expanded to include all species of small carnivore. In 2006 the program also began focused conservation activities for Vietnam's two species of pangolin, the Chinese pangolin and the Sunda pangolin. All of these species are threatened by the illegal wildlife trade which is having a devastating impact on the wild populations of these species throughout South East Asia.

The CPCP aims to conserve these threatened species of mammal through the rescue and rehabilitation of trade confiscated wildlife, education and awareness and field research. The CPCP also runs the region's only conservation breeding program for the Owston's civet, a species that is endemic to Indochina, and whose main range is within Vietnam.

The CPCP's main centre is within Cúc Phương National Park, but operates a nationwide rescue program and has active field sites in Central and Southern Vietnam.

Turtle Conservation Center 
The turtle conservation center was established in 1998 and is home to some of the most endangered turtles in Vietnam, including the Vietnamese pond turtle which is nearly extinct in the wild.

Tourism 

Cúc Phương National Park is one of the most popular nature tourist destinations in Vietnam. Tens of thousands of Vietnamese and a steady stream of foreign tourists visit the park each year. Lodging and restaurant facilities are available at the park's entrance and within the park. A paved road cuts into the park and a number of paths for hiking are maintained. Park rangers patrol Cuc Phuong and provide guided tours for a fee.

Other nearby tourist destinations located in Ninh Binh Province include Phát Diệm Cathedral, Hoa Lư Ancient Capital, Tam Cốc – Bích Động, Tràng An, and Bai Dinh Pagoda.

References

External links 

Carnivore & Pangolin Conservation Program
Cúc Phương Turtle Conservation Center
Cuc Phuong Endangered Primate Conservation Center

National parks of Vietnam
Geography of Thanh Hóa province
Geography of Ninh Bình province
IUCN Category II
Protected areas established in 1960
Tourist attractions in Thanh Hóa province
Tourist attractions in Ninh Bình province